Crescent School is a Private preparatory coeducational day School for pupils aged 3 – 11. It is located in the Bilton area of Rugby, Warwickshire, England. It was informally started in 1946, and founded in 1948 as a school for the children of Rugby School masters. It was housed in Rugby School buildings. Having opened its doors to children living in Rugby and the surrounding district, it out–grew its premises and, in 1988, purchased a purpose-built school in Bilton, a leafy, residential suburb approximately 2 miles south of Rugby town centre.

There are currently 167 pupils on role including 19 children aged 3–4 in the very successful Pathfinders Nursery . Since 2017, the school has been a part of the Princethorpe Foundation, alongside secondary school Princethorpe College, fellow primary school Crackley Hall and nursery Little Crackers. The headmaster, Joe Thackway is a member of Independent Association of Preparatory Schools and the school is an accredited member of Independent Schools Council, having undergone Independent Schools Inspectorate and Ofsted inspections.

References

External links
School website

Private schools in Warwickshire
Schools in Rugby, Warwickshire